Minnesota New Country School (MNCS) is a Charter school in Henderson, Minnesota, United States, established in 1993.

History 
The school's first year was 1994-1995 originally in Le Sueur, Minnesota.

In 1995 students discovered deformed frogs at a pond at the Ney Nature Center. The frogs were researched by scientists to discover the reason for the deformity. It was never decided was caused the frogs to be deformed.

MNCS was moved to Henderson in 1998 with a brand new building.

MNCS expanded from 6-12 to k-12 in 2013.

References

External links
Official Website
Minnesota New Country School (MNCS) Henderson, Minn. at the U.S. Department of Education

Charter schools in Minnesota
Public high schools in Minnesota
Public middle schools in Minnesota
Schools in Sibley County, Minnesota
Education in Sibley County, Minnesota
Educational institutions established in 1994
1994 establishments in Minnesota